The Price of Happiness is a lost 1916 silent film drama directed by Edmund Lawrence and starring Mary Boland. It was distributed through the World Film Company. The film was based on a play called (Drei Paar Schuhe: Three Pairs of Shoes).

Cast
Mary Boland - Bertha Miller
Marion Singer - Lucille
Enid Francis - Ruth Taylor
Carlotta De Felice - Evelyn Morgan (*billed Carlotta De Felico)
Albert Bechtel - Max
David Wall - John Miller (*billed as Dave Wall)
Adolphe Menjou - Howard Neal

References

External links
 The Price of Happiness @ IMDb.com

1916 films
American silent feature films
Lost American films
1916 drama films
American black-and-white films
World Film Company films
Silent American drama films
1916 lost films
Lost drama films
1910s American films